This is a list of years in the Democratic Republic of the Congo.

Democratic Republic of the Congo

Zaire

Democratic Republic of the Congo

Belgian Congo

Congo Free State

See also 
 Timeline of healthcare in the Democratic Republic of the Congo
 Timeline of Kinshasa
 Timeline of Lubumbashi

Bibliography

External links
 
 

 
Democratic Republic of the Congo
Years